In the geologic timescale, the Callovian is an age and stage in the Middle Jurassic, lasting between 165.3 ± 1.1 Ma (million years ago) and 161.5 ± 1.0 Ma. It is the last stage of the Middle Jurassic, following the Bathonian and preceding the Oxfordian.

Stratigraphic definitions
The Callovian Stage was first described by French palaeontologist Alcide d'Orbigny in 1852. Its name derives from the latinized name for Kellaways Bridge, a small hamlet 3 km north-east of Chippenham, Wiltshire, England.

The base of the Callovian is defined as the place in the stratigraphic column where the ammonite genus Kepplerites first appears, which is the base of the biozone of Macrocephalites herveyi. A global reference profile (a GSSP) for the base had in 2009 not yet been assigned.

The top of the Callovian (the base of the Oxfordian) is at the first appearance of ammonite species Brightia thuouxensis.

Subdivision

The Callovian is often subdivided into three substages (or subages): Lower/Early, Middle and Upper/Late Callovian. In the Tethys domain, the Callovian encompasses six ammonite biozones:
 zone of Quenstedtoceras lamberti
 zone of Peltoceras athleta
 zone of Erymnoceras coronatum
 zone of Reineckeia anceps
 zone of Macrocephalites gracilis
 zone of Bullatimorphites bullatus

Palaeogeography 
 
During the Callovian, Europe was an archipelago of a dozen or so large islands. Between them were extensive areas of continental shelf. Consequently, there are shallow marine Callovian deposits in Russia and from Belarus, through Poland and Germany, into France and eastern Spain and much of England. Around the former island coasts are frequently, land-derived sediments. These are to be found, for example, in western Scotland.

The Louann Salt and the southern Campeche Salt of the Gulf of Mexico are thought to have formed by an embayment of the Pacific Ocean across modern-day Mexico.

References

Literature
; 2002: Histoire de la Terre, Dunod, Paris (2nd ed.), . 
; 2004: A Geologic Time Scale 2004, Cambridge University Press.
; 1842: Paléontologie française. 1. Terrains oolitiques ou jurassiques. 642 p, Bertrand, Paris.

External links
GeoWhen Database - Callovian
Jurassic-Cretaceous timescale, at the website of the subcommission for stratigraphic information of the ICS
Stratigraphic chart of the Upper Jurassic, at the website of Norges Network of offshore records of geology and stratigraphy
  This contains a detailed description of the British and European strata as understood at the time.

 
04
Geological ages